Parag Saxena (Hindi: पराग सक्सेना; born 27 April 1955) is a Co-Founder and General Partner of Vedanta Capital.

Early life and education 
Saxena earned a B.Tech from the Indian Institute of Technology, an M.S. in Chemical Engineering from the West Virginia College of Graduate Studies and an M.B.A. from the Wharton School of the University of Pennsylvania.

Career 

Saxena started his career at Becton Dickinson as a product manager in 1978.

Previously, Saxena was the Managing Partner and founded Invesco Private Capital, a subsidiary of Invesco. Parag, over the course of four years, consistently qualified for Forbes Midas List. Parag was named the 23rd, 38th, 31st and 28th best deal maker in venture capital in the 2006, 2007, 2008 and 2009 lists, respectively.

References

1955 births
Living people
Businesspeople from Pune
Private equity and venture capital investors
Wharton School of the University of Pennsylvania alumni
IIT Bombay alumni